Riaño is one of six parishes (administrative divisions) in Langreo, a municipality within the province and autonomous community of Asturias, in northern Spain.

The residential area of Riaño was built on the existing farmland in the area during the 1960s, in order to decongest the urban core of Langreo. Today, about 5000 people live in the parish.

In 1978 a hospital, the Hospital Valle del Nalón, was opened in the parish. Riaño also has a medical center, a library, a sports center, two public schools and a geriatric facility. It is located three kilometres from la Felguera.

Parishes in Langreo
Langreo